Scar Peak is a peak ( high) surmounting the northern wall of Taylor Valley immediately east of the Lacroix Glacier in Victoria Land. It was named by the New Zealand Geographic Board in 1998 after the Scientific Committee on Antarctic Research (SCAR).

References

Mountains of Victoria Land